Natalya Tsyganova (born 7 February 1971 in Frunze, Kyrgyz SSR) is a Russian middle distance runner who specializes in the 800 metres.

International competitions

Personal bests
400 metres - 52.02 s (1998)
800 metres - 1:56.60 min (2000)
1500 metres - 4:08.07 min (1999)

See also
List of eligibility transfers in athletics
List of European Athletics Indoor Championships medalists (women)
List of IAAF World Indoor Championships medalists (women)

References

1971 births
Living people
Sportspeople from Bishkek
Russian female middle-distance runners
Ukrainian female middle-distance runners
Olympic female middle-distance runners
Olympic athletes of Russia
Athletes (track and field) at the 2000 Summer Olympics
World Athletics Championships athletes for Russia
Russian Athletics Championships winners